Walking Back to Happiness is the third album by John Cooper Clarke, originally released  on 10" clear vinyl in 1979, and long out of print. All tracks were recorded live, with the exception of the final track, "Gimmix", was re-recorded in studio and became a UK top 40 hit that year. The penultimate track refers to The Marble Index a 1969 album by Nico.

Track listing
All tracks written by John Cooper Clarke

"Gaberdine Angus" - 1:15
"Majorca" - 2:28
"Bronze Adonis" - 2:22
"Spilt Beans" - 2:22
"Twat" - 2:24
"The Pest" - 2:16
"Nothing" - 0:42
"Limbo" - 4:21
"Who Stole the Marble Index?" - 1:22
"Gimmix Play Loud" - 3:26

Personnel
John Cooper Clarke – vocals
with:
The Invisible Girls - music on "Gimmix Play Loud"

Notes

External links
John Cooper Clarke Home Page

John Cooper Clarke albums
1979 live albums
Albums produced by Martin Hannett
Epic Records live albums